Crow Lagoon is a little-known volcanic center located north of Prince Rupert, British Columbia, Canada. There are beds of thick, basaltic tephra that are of Holocene age.

Crow Lagoon is one of the top 10 volcanoes in Canada with recent seismic activity, the others include: Castle Rock, Mount Edziza volcanic complex, Mount Cayley, Hoodoo Mountain, The Volcano, Mount Silverthrone, Mount Meager massif, Wells Gray-Clearwater volcanic field and Mount Garibaldi.

See also
List of volcanoes in Canada
List of Northern Cordilleran volcanoes
Northern Cordilleran Volcanic Province
Volcanism of Canada
Volcanism of Western Canada

References

Cinder cones of British Columbia
Holocene volcanoes
Polygenetic volcanoes